Kesineni Srinivas, also known as Nani, is an Indian politician and entrepreneur. He is the current Member of Parliament in Lok Sabha from Vijayawada Parliamentary Constituency.

Early and personal life
Kesineni Nani was born in Vijayawada to Ramaswamy Kesineni and Prasunamba Kesineni on 22 January 1966. He spent his entire childhood in the city along with his siblings.
He married Smt. Pavani Kesineni on 16 April 1992 and has two daughters.

Career

Political 
Nani joined Praja Rajyam Party on Oct. 26th, 2008. He continued his services to party for 3 months only and he quit it in Jan. 2009. He joined Telugu Desam Party thereafter.

He was elected as a member of parliament from Vijayawada Loksabha constituency in 2014 general elections from Telugu Desam party and re-elected from same constituency in 2019.

At the Lok Sabha, Nani is currently a member of Indian Council of Medical Research committee. Earlier he was a member of the Committee on Privileges, Standing Committee on Urban Development and the Consultative Committee, Ministry of Rural Development, Panchayati Raj and Drinking Water and Sanitation.

Non-political 
Kesineni Travels was started by Kesineni Nani's grandfather, Kesineni Venkaiah in 1928 and with 90 years of legacy. Kesineni Travels came to a halt on March 31, 2018.

References

India MPs 2014–2019
Living people
Telugu politicians
Businesspeople from Vijayawada
Telugu Desam Party politicians
Politicians from Vijayawada
Lok Sabha members from Andhra Pradesh
Praja Rajyam Party politicians
1966 births